The TauTona Mine or Western Deep No.3 Shaft, was a gold mine in South Africa.

The mine was one of the three Western Deep Levels mines of the West Wits gold field west of Johannesburg. The mine is near the town of Carletonville. TauTona neighbours the Mponeng and Savuka mines and they share processing abilities. All three were owned by AngloGold Ashanti until Savuka was closed in 2017, TauTona in 2018 and Mponeng was purchased by Harmony Gold in 2020.

The name TauTona means "great lion" in the Setswana language. The mine began operation in 1962. It was one of the most efficient mines in South Africa and remained in continuous operation even during periods when the price of gold was low. Two secondary shafts were added to bring the mine to its current depth. The mine was a dangerous place to work, with an average of five miners dying in accidents each year. The mine is so deep that temperatures in the mine can rise to life-threatening levels. Air-conditioning equipment was used to cool the mine from  down to a more tolerable . The rock face temperature reaches .

By 2008, the mine reached  underground. This new shaft extended the depth from its previous , with the intent of extending the mine's life to 2015.

The lift cage that transported the workers from the surface to the bottom traveled at 16 metres per second (36 mph / 58 km/h) so together with traveling on horizontal trolleys the journey to the rock face could take up to 1 hour from the surface level. The mine has been featured on the MegaStructures television program produced by the National Geographic Channel.

In the 2008 financial year, there were seven fatal accidents at AngloGold Ashanti's West Wits operations in which 14 miners died, four of those at the TauTona mine.

Production
Production figures of the TauTona Mine were the following:

References

External links
 Hücreli Aspiratör 
 Tau Tona mine (ZAF-00566) Secretariat of the African, Caribbean and Pacific Group of States website

Gold mines in South Africa
Underground mines in South Africa
Buildings and structures in Gauteng
AngloGold Ashanti
Economy of Gauteng
Non-renewable resource companies established in 1962
1962 establishments in South Africa